Albaida is a municipality in the comarca of Vall d'Albaida in the Valencian Community, Spain.

Main sights
 Palace of Milà i Aragó
 Segrelles Museum
 Route of the Borgias
 Route of the Valencian classics

Notable people
 José Segrelles, painter and illustrator
 Daniel Olcina, footballer

References